Initiated in 1997–98, the Castrol Awards for Cricketing Excellence recognizes outstanding performances by Indian cricketers - past, present and future.

Awards

2011-2007

2006-2002

2001-1998

Special awards

 2010
Rahul Dravid – Highest number of catches in Test matches

Yusuf Pathan – Impact Cricketer

Awarding Methodology

Castrol Indian Cricketer of the Year Award

The winner is selected through a process that has two stages.

In the first stage, performances by Indians in Tests and one-day internationals in the Castrol Cricket Year are rated in the following categories:
Aggregate - Tests / ODIs; Wickets - Tests / ODIs; Batting average – Tests / ODIs; Bowling average - Tests / ODIs; Catches taken - Tests / ODIs.
Points are then allotted to each player in each of the categories in descending order. Thus, the highest scorer in tests gets 10 points, the second-highest gets 9 points, the third-highest gets 8 and so on. Similarly, the highest scorer in one-day internationals gets 10 points, the second highest gets 9 and so on. The same holds for the other categories.

At the end of the Castrol Year, the aggregate of the points gained by every player in all ten categories is computed and the players with the top five aggregates are declared the nominees for the Castrol Indian Cricketer of the Year Award.

In the second stage, a 'ballot form' comprising the names of the five nominees and a summary of their performances in tests and one-day internationals (with stats) is sent to all the living cricketers who have represented India in at least one test or five one-day internationals. They are asked to 'vote' for one of the five nominees and the player who receives the highest number of votes is declared the winner. The voting is by secret ballot and is monitored by Professional Management Group.

This award is not at all related to any kind of monitory gain for cricketers. But it confirms the brand value of them, just like any other prestigious awards. In 2010 and 2011, Sachin Tendulkar and MS Dhoni received the Castrol Indian cricketer of the year awards. These reputation and great performance increased their earnings. Still both of them are listed as the top 10 richest cricketers in the world.

Castrol Junior Cricketer of the Year

Performances of under-19 cricketers in under-19 / under-17 / under-15 level tournaments in the CASTROL Year are taken into account, as also performances in the Ranji Trophy by cricketers from this age-group. Maximum weightage is given to cricketers who have represented India in international junior-level tournaments like the Under-19 World Cup / Asia Cup or have been part of the India 'A' team on overseas tours.

Performances are scrutinized and a list of 15 players is sent to a panel of judges who have been associated with junior cricket. They are asked to recommend five nominees for the award and then pick one from among the five whom they feel deserves the award the most.

Lifetime achievement award

This award is presented to a personality who has brought laurels to Indian cricket with consistent and outstanding performances that earned him the adulation of the countrymen and respect of his opponents.

References

Cricket awards and rankings